Veritable Records are historical records compiled by government (court) historians of Chinese dynasties since the 6th century, and later in Korea, Japan and Vietnam which adopted the Chinese bureaucratic system and the writing system of Classical Chinese. Typically they were compiled immediately following the death of a monarch (preparations sometimes began while he was still alive) and follow a strictly prescribed format. Veritable Records are highly detailed and contain a wealth of political, economical, military, and biographical information.

Famous examples include (all written in Classical Chinese):
 China: Ming Shilu (Veritable Records of Ming), Qing Shilu (Veritable Records of Qing)
 Japan: Nihon Sandai Jitsuroku (Veritable Records of Three Reigns of Japan)
 Korea: Joseon Wangjo Sillok (Veritable Records of the Joseon Dynasty)
 Vietnam: Đại Nam thực lục (Veritable Records of Great Nam)

During the Yuan and Qing dynasties of China, Veritable Records were also written in Mongol and Manchu respectively.

Origin
The earliest Veritable Records were those compiled under the direction of Zhou Xingsi (周興嗣, 469–521) for the reign of the Emperor Wu of Liang (r. 502–549), but the practice of writing Veritable Records did not become standardized until the reign of the Emperor Taizong of Tang (r. 626–649), who was obsessed with his historical legacy.

Examples

References

Citations

Sources 

 
 

Imperial China